Nemesio E. Caravana (born 1901) was a Filipino film director and actor.

He made a film acting debut in a 1939 Filipino literature story Florante at Laura under Salumbides Co Ltd. He made another two movies as an actor in Sampaguita Pictures' musical Magbalik ka Hirang (Come Back, Darling) and another musical from Salumbides Pictures, Krisantemo (Chrysanthemum).

After World War II, he made his directorial debut in LVN Pictures movie of Kaaway ng Babae (Enemy of Man).

In 1953, he made a movie outside LVN through Premiere Production titled Carlos Trece (Carlos 13), about a mutiny in the Philippines.

Filmography

1939 - Florante at Laura
1940 - Magbalik ka, Hirang
1940 - Krisantemo
1948 - Kaaway ng Babae
1949 - Maria Beles
1949 - Kuba sa Quiapo
1949 - Virginia
1950 - Dayang-Dayang
1950 - Sohrab at Rustum
1951 - David at Goliath
1953 - Maria Mercedes
1953 - Carlos Trece
1953 - Siga-Siga
1953 - Kapitan Berong
1954 - Ri-Gi-Ding
1954 - Ander De Saya
1955 - Minera
1955 - Ha Cha Cha
1955 - El Jugador
1955 - Magia Blanca
1956 - Prinsipe Villarba
1957 - Pabo Real
1957 - Prinsipe Alejandre
1958 - Batang Piyer
1958 - May Pasikat ba sa Kano?
1958 - Ramadal
1958 - Wanted: Husband

References

References 

Filipino male film actors
Filipino film directors
1901 births
Year of death missing